Kenneth John Friar OBE (born 13 August 1934) is a former board member, managing director and secretary of Arsenal Football Club. In September 2020 he was appointed life president of the club.

Ken Friar was educated at St John's School, Highbury and Highbury County Grammar School after passing the eleven-plus. Friar began working at Arsenal part-time as a 12-year-old. He left school in 1950 and started work in the club's box office. Friar rose through the club ranks and became company secretary replacing Bob Wall in 1973. During this time, he took part in discussions held in the 1970s between the boards of Arsenal and rivals Tottenham Hotspur FC to share a new stadium at Alexandra Palace. In 1983, he was appointed managing director by chairman Peter Hill-Wood, a role he lasted in until 2000. During this time, Friar has taken an active role in negotiating manager and player contracts as well as fostering Arsenal's links with the community and supporter groups. He stepped down from this role to concentrate on the club's move to the Emirates Stadium and served on the board until September 2020 when he retired. On 1 May 2008 it was announced that he had become acting managing director on the resignation of Keith Edelman prior to the appointment of Ivan Gazidis.

Friar was appointed Officer of the Order of the British Empire (OBE) in the 2000 Birthday Honours for services to association football. The London Borough of Islington also awarded him the freedom of the borough in 2004.

As at 27 March 2007 he owned 47 shares representing 0.07% of Arsenal Football Club after he transferred 147 to the then Arsenal chairman Peter Hill-Wood.

As of 7 September 2015, he owned 1 share representing 0.0016% of Arsenal Football Club, Ivan Gazidis also owns 1 share, with the remaining shares being owned by Arsenal (AFC Holdings) limited.

On 14 April 2011, The North Bridge, which joins Arsenal's Emirates Stadium to Arsenal tube station, was renamed ‘The Ken Friar Bridge’ in tribute to Club Director Ken Friar OBE.

At a short ceremony attended by Friar himself, family, friends and Club staff, a statue was unveiled at the end of the bridge, opposite the Arsenal Museum at the north end of the stadium. The statue depicts Friar playing football as a youngster in 1945 in front of the old Highbury Stadium.

References

External links 

1934 births
Living people
British businesspeople
Arsenal F.C. directors and chairmen
Officers of the Order of the British Empire
People from Islington (district)
People from Winchmore Hill